Dhaka is a town and a notified area in the district of East Champaran entry point Mehsi in the state of Bihar, India. Dhaka is Nagar Parishad that is divided into 25 wards. It is the headquarters of  Sikrahana subdivision. In the last 10–15 years Dhaka emerged as the town for its nearby area. It is very close to the border of Nepal. People of all religions live here, but this is a predominantly Muslim area. Its land is second cheapest after Raxaul in Bihar. There are both criminal and civil courts dealing with cases for the whole jurisdiction. There are two graduate degree level colleges in Dhaka. There are busy and bustling markets here that offers goods of all brands.

Dhaka is also known as a land of 'champaran satyagrah' which was started by Mahatma Gandhi.

Geography
It has an average elevation of 55 metres (180 feet). Its boundaries touch Nepal, Sitamari, and Sheohar.

It is 30 km from Chakia, 12 km from Bairgania and 28 km from Motihari.

Political history 
Dhaka is famous for leaders like Avaneesh Kumar Singh. Born in an educated family, his father Late Shri Vindhyachal Singh was a noted scholar. Vindhyachal Singh served as Deputy District Magistrate and District Welfare officer of Chaibasa and Dumka respectively of then Bihar and now Jharkhand. Avaneesh Kumar Singh emerged as a Hindu face and he brought The Bhartiya Janta Party on grounds in the late 1990s. With a record margin of 1.5 lakh votes he won the first election and later served 4 times from the same constituency and one time from Chiraiya Constituency as Member of Legislative Assembly (MLA). Motiur Rahman, who was MLA during early 1990s, and became Rajya Sabha MP in 2004. He died in 2007. Apart from him, many politicians such as Anwarul Haque, Nek Mohammad, Pawan Jaiswal, Faisal Rahman are from this area. Pawan Jaisawal was MLA of Dhaka from 2010-2015. Faisal Rahman served as MLA from 2015-2020. The current MLA is Pawan Jaisawal, from Bhartiya Janta Party.

Faisal Rahman is the son of MP Motiur Rahman. As an MLA Pawan Jaiswal started a very good and appreciable tradition of group marriage "samuhik vivah". In his first year 75 were married, then 101 couples, then 125 couples benefited from this policy. 

Shri Vishwanath Singh and Shri Namdev Prasad Shrivastava from the nearby village Ruphara were eminent freedom fighters and were prominent in Gandhi's Champaran Satyagraha and Quit India Movement.

References

External links
 Website : 

Cities and towns in East Champaran district